Dollman's vlei rat (Otomys dollmani) is a species of rodent in the family Muridae.
It is found only in Kenya. Its natural habitats are subtropical or tropical high-altitude grassland and swamps. It is threatened by habitat loss. Some authorities, including the IUCN, regard it as a synonym of Otomys tropicalis.

References

Endemic fauna of Kenya
Otomys
Mammals described in 1912
Taxonomy articles created by Polbot
Taxa named by Edmund Heller
Taxobox binomials not recognized by IUCN